Mount Bushnell State Park is an undeveloped public recreation area located south of Lake Waramaug in the New England town of Washington, Connecticut. The state park provides  for hiking. The park had its genesis in the state's purchase of 70 acres in 1916. It is managed by the 
Connecticut Department of Energy and Environmental Protection.

References

External links
Mount Bushnell State Park Connecticut Department of Energy and Environmental Protection

State parks of Connecticut
Parks in Litchfield County, Connecticut
Washington, Connecticut
Protected areas established in 1916